George Bromley (ca. 1526–1589) was an English lawyer, landowner, politician and judge of the Mid-Tudor and Elizabethan period, a member of an important Shropshire legal and landed gentry dynasty. Although his career was overshadowed by that of his brother Thomas Bromley, George Bromley was of considerable importance in the affairs of the Welsh marches and the Inner Temple. He was an MP for Liskeard 1563, Much Wenlock in 1558 and 1559 and Shropshire in 1571 and 1572.

Background and early life

George Bromley was born around 1526. He was the first son of
George Bromley of Hodnet, close to Market Drayton in Shropshire, the son of William Bromley of Mitley and Beatrix Hill.
Jane Lacon, daughter of Sir Thomas Lacon of Willey, Shropshire.

The elder George Bromley was a prominent lawyer, important in the affairs of the Inner Temple, where he was Autumn Reader for 1508 and Lent Reader for 1509, although he refused the honour for Lent 1515. He was also recorder (judge) of Shrewsbury. His younger cousin, Thomas Bromley, also served as recorder of Shrewsbury and was made Chief Justice of the King's Bench by Mary I. The cousins both exercised considerable power regionally as legal officers of the Council in the Marches of Wales, which embodied the power of central government in this still-turbulent region.

The young George Bromley was left without a father in 1533 and must have undergone a protracted, wardship but nothing is known of it. It was possibly ameliorated by the influence of his father's cousin, Chief Justice Thomas Bromley.

Family tree: the Bromley dynasty
Based primarily on the Heraldic Visitations of Shropshire and Cheshire, with assistance from the History of Parliament Online, the family tree illustrates Thomas Bromley's relationship to the rest of the Bromley dynasty and to their main allies, the Hill, Corbet and Newport families, c. 1450–1650.

Landowner
The Bromleys were a landed gentry family in a county without a resident aristocracy and dominated throughout the century by the gentry. However, their estates were not large: their wealth came from their use of their education and contacts to tap into the opportunities for enrichment offered by the State, both national and local. George Bromley was the heir to the family estates, the most substantial at Hawkstone, near Hodnet, where they lived cheek by jowl with the Hills, their closest allies. George also had land at Wistanswick, a few miles east of Hodnet, at Allerton, and elsewhere in Shropshire.

However, Bromley made a strategic marriage to Joan Waverton, heiress to the estate of Hallon, in the parish of Worfield, east of Bridgnorth. Hallon, also rendered Hawne, which represents its pronunciation more effectively, lay to the south-west of Worfield village. Bromley made it his home and it was passed on to his heirs. However, his granddaughter, Jane, daughter of Francis Bromley, married into the Davenport family, allegedly after a secret courtship. An extremely protracted legal battle left Hallon in the hands of the Davenports and the seat of the Bromleys was replaced by Davenport House, although Hallon remains as a local toponym and street name.

Legal training and career at Inner Temple

The chief justice probably influenced also the legal training of his cousins once removed: certainly he left a small annuity as a bequest to encourage George's younger brother, the future Lord Chancellor, to continue his legal studies. George himself was trained at the Inner Temple and called to the bar, followed a few years later by his brother, Thomas.

The Inn gradually entrusted George with posts of honour and authority, beginning with ceremonial functions, like steward to the reader's dinner in 1555 and for the Lent vacation in 1556. The followed more responsible posts: he was appointed auditor to the steward of the Inn in November 1556 and surveyor of the Inn's church in the summer of 1558. With the new reign, his career at the Inn, as in other respects, immediately accelerated. He was made a bencher by a resolution of the Inn's parliament on 23 April 1559, along with William Rothewood and Richard Onslow, another successful Shropshire lawyer-politician and a noted Puritan. Bromley's first appearance as a bencher at the parliament of the Inn was recorded as 2 October 1559, although the sequence suggests that this is a mistake for All Souls' Day, 2 November, one of the customary days for the parliament. His attendance at parliament thereafter was very frequent, although from February 1563, when Thomas first appeared as a bencher, the brothers more often alternated than attended together.

Further honours now followed rapidly. A parliament on 4 May 1561 appointed Bromley Autumn Reader for the year. and a year later, in recognition of his discharge of the office, he was allowed to make a special admission to the inn of Edward Caryll, a member of a well-known recusant family from Sussex. On 3 November 1567 Bromley was elected treasurer of the Inn. It appears that Bromley, like his brother some years later, clamped down on debt and dereliction of duty to steady the Inn's shaky finances. Later in the month parliament decreed penalties for those who were more than 40 shillings in arrears. Officials who failed to perform their duties at Christmas were fined £5 – a large sum. In the summer of 1568 debtors were warned that they faced loss of their chambers if they failed to pay within three months. The new regime seems to have met with the approval of most, as exactly a year after he was first elected, Bromley was re-elected treasurer and appointed Lent Reader for 1569 Soon he was extracting large sums of £20 and £40 from members to commute future fees and duties, while the precise fees for admissions were reasserted and minuted. Bromley was evidently elected for a third term, as he attended parliament as treasurer until he was replaced by Francis Gawdy on 2 November 1570.

Elizabeth's ministers had long been concerned about Catholic influence in the legal profession and had sought to exclude recusants from the Inns of Court from 1569. Bromley and Edward Flowerdew were given the task of compiling a return of suspected recusants at the inner Temple in 1577. This they did with great thoroughness, returning 59 names, carefully classified according to presumed levels of complicity.

Bromley retained a chamber at the Inner Temple until his death. It was situated in an area known as Mr. Hare's Court, as Hugh Hare had long had a study on the upper floor. The chamber had been restored to use after it had fallen into decay by William Towse, who was allowed to share it with Bromley for life.

Political and judicial career

Early parliamentary career
Bromley was a made a Steward of crown lands in Shropshire by March 1554, perhaps by Queen Mary and was from the outset of his career committed to a power base in his own county of Shropshire. He was elected MP for Much Wenlock in the last parliament of Mary's reign, which assembled on 23 January 1558 and lasted until the succession of Elizabeth brought about its dissolution on 17 November. Sir George Blount was the other MP, elected ahead of Bromley in order of precedence, while Thomas Bromley was elected for Bridgnorth.

The brothers were favoured by the great influence of their relatives. Their mother's family, the Lacons, exercised considerable sway in the Shropshire borough elections. At Much Wenlock the contracting parties to the election were the High Sheriff of Shropshire, the town's bailiff and the bugesses, the sheriff being Richard Newport, who was married to their second cousin, Margaret, the daughter of the late Chief Justice Thomas Bromley. George was elected to the next parliament, the first of Elizabeth's reign, on 19 January 1559, again for Much Wenlock: this time his colleague was Roland Lacon, who was his first cousin and Blount's uncle.

Bromley was also elected to the following parliament, which assembled in January 1563. This time he seems to have relied on powerful court connections which he shared with his brother: specifically Francis Russell, 2nd Earl of Bedford, and Lord Burleigh, the queen's closest adviser. They had great influence over the return of MPs for the borough of Liskeard in Cornwall, where Bedford was Lord Warden of the Stannaries. Bromley was returned alongside a local gentry politician, Reginald Mohun.

Judicial and administrative preferment
However, in Elizabeth's reign he was appointed to a series of important posts in both the judiciary and in civic authority. A member of the Council in the Marches of Wales, he was appointed Justice of the Peace successively in counties across the border country and West Midlands: Shropshire, Cheshire, Denbighshire and Warwickshire. In 1564 the bishops were asked by the Privy Council to report on the suitability and religious reliability of the local magistrates. For Shropshire, Thomas Bentham, the Bishop of Lichfield and Coventry, Bromley's good standing as a Protestant and commented:
I know the learning of none muche reported, but of Justice Corbet, and George Bramley.

With such episcopal approval, his promotion was swift. From 1566 to 1580 he was Attorney-General of the Duchy of Lancaster 1566–80, a post of great power and patronage, especially in the north-west of England, although the duchy had land and employees all over the country. He became an ecclesiastical commissioner in 1572. By 1574 he was Custos rotulorum of Shropshire, the senior civil authority in the county. After serving as justice of the Anglesey circuit from 1567–80, he was appointed justice of Chester in May 1580. Thereafter he collected at least three recorderships: at Worcester, Shrewsbury and Bridgnorth by 1583.

The Council in the Marches

Bromley was a member of the Council in the Marches of Wales by 1560, but may have been appointed considerably earlier. It was the main organ of the state not only in most of Wales but also in the neighbouring counties of England and even Worcestershire, and for 26 years from 1560 its president was Sir Henry Sidney, a pillar of the Protestant establishment and brother-in-law of Robert Dudley, 1st Earl of Leicester, the queen's favourite. Bromley the chief legal official of the council, receiving the substantial salary of £200 per annum.

Bromley was sometimes given tasks beyond his remit as a legal officer: in 1569, for example, he was one of those named as responsible for the official store of arms and ammunition in Merionethshire. Frequently he was involved in the imposition of the Elizabethan religious settlement, a role he took on also at the Inner Temple. In 1573 he was appointed to a commission of oyer and terminer with the task of imposing the Act of Uniformity 1558, which made it mandatory for everyone to worship regularly in their parish church according to the Book of Common Prayer. In 1577 he was appointed to another commission of oyer and terminer on the death of the assize judges.

Like other council members, Bromley was reputed for his attention to justice, especially to speed and fairness to the poor. In November 1580 Bromley and Henry Townshend, the MP for Bridgnorth, and Justice of Chester, wrote to Thomas Bromley, now Lord Chancellor, asking him to intervene against one John Hughes, who was using vexatious tactics against 17 poor men of the region, deliberately taking up residence in Westminster and suing them in the capital. Bromley and Townshent pointed out that Hughes had already acquired a reputation as a litigious nuisance in Montgomeryshire. Next month, Bromley was appointed to the Denbighshire commission for musters, the body responsible for raising troops in the county: in this case extremely detailed instructions were given to ensure that all eligible men were available and equipped. The council was proud of its efficiency as well as its relative freedom from corruption. In January 1581 Bromley and Sidney raised by 50% the pay of the clockkeeper at Ludlow Castle, where the council generally met, because of his diligence. In 1586, on the death of Sidney, Bromley took the leadership of the council until a new appointment, Henry Herbert, 2nd Earl of Pembroke, could take over.

MP for Shropshire
Bromley was elected knight of the shire for Shropshire in 1571, second to the Catholic landowner Sir George Blount, as he had been at Much Wenlock at the very beginning of his political career. Despite his religious views, Blount was known to be entirely loyal to Elizabeth and her government. However, these were turbulent times, with rebellion and plots constantly in the air. The Privy Council had written on the queen's behalf to reliable Protestant agents in each county to secure careful vetting of candidates, in Shropshire selecting Sir Andrew Corbet. Corbet had certainly written to the bailiffs at Shrewsbury, urging them to consider "hie Grace's sayde letters to the accomplishment off hie highness playsyer theryn," and probably in similar terms to other returning officers and contracting parties. He exercised a veto over parliamentary nominations throughout the county in 1571 and 1572. Bromley was elected again in 1572, this time taking the senior seat over George Mainwaring. Bromley would have been well-known to Corbet through their work together for the Council in the Marches. They were seen together in public on many occasions, and were feasted together at a cost of £2 1s. 6d. by Shrewsbury council in 1573.

By now a reputable lawyer, Bromley was given considerable responsibility, mainly within his own areas of interest and expertise and also in important matters of State and Church. In 1571 he sat on a committee concerning Papal bulls, considering what became the Bulls, etc., from Rome Act 1570. He attended a conference with the House of Lords on the treasons bill that was to issue in the Rebellion Act 1572 and another on the 12 shires of Wales. In 1572 Bromley served on two different committees considering the problem of Mary Queen of Scots. He was also on a committee concerned with the restoration of title and lands to Reginald Grey, 5th Earl of Kent. Another of his committees dealt with a bill to restore the finances of Tonbridge School, which had almost lost its buildings and land because its endowment by Henry Fisher of the Worshipful Company of Skinners was challenged by his descendants.

After its brief 1572 session, Parliament did not assemble again until 1576. In February Bromley helped question Peter Wentworth, the Puritan MP for Tregony. Wentworth had delivered a speech in which he declared that "in this House which is termed a place of free speech there is nothing so necessary for the preservation of the prince and state as free speech, and without it it is a scorn and mockery to call it a Parliament house," and had gone on explicitly to criticise the queen for attempting to influence proceedings. As a result of the committee's examination, he was committed to the Tower of London and only released for the end of the session. Later that month Bromley helped investigate the case of Arthur Hall, who was using parliamentary privilege to avoid paying damages of £100 in compensation for an injury inflicted by one of his servants on Melchisedech Mallory during a brawl over a dice game in St Paul's churchyard. Bromley reported back to the House on developments and ultimately the House of Commons asserted for the first time its right to discipline as well as protect members and their staff.

Parliament was not called again until 1584 and on that occasion Bromley was able to get his eldest son, Francis Bromley, elected MP for Shropshire.

Justice and recorder
Bromley's appointment as Justice of Chester in May 1580 was apparently through the influence of Burleigh himself. He joined Henry Townshend, who had been appointed a year before, and replaced Sir John Throckmorton, who had recently died after falling into disgrace a year earlier for giving judgment in favour of a relative. The month after his appointment at Chester, Bromley was knighted.

In May 1582 Bromley intervened in the case of the aged Lady Mary Egerton of Ridley, Cheshire, who was accused of recusancy. His attention was probably drawn to this by her husband's illegitimate son, Thomas Egerton, already a distinguished lawyer and a future Lord Chancellor. Bromley wrote to William Chaderton, the Bishop of Chester, and Sir Henry Stanley, asking them to delay proceedings against her for three months and telling them he had "good hope of conformitie in her." He seems to have pulled his more powerful connections into the campaign, for his brother Thomas, the Lord Chancellor, sent a supporting letter in July and Sir Christopher Hatton did the same in January 1583.

Bromley was far less sympathetic or lenient in the Recusancy case of Richard Gwyn, a Welsh Bard and schoolmaster from Wrexham. Beginning in May 1581, Sir George Bromley took a leading role in Gwyn's four year long imprisonment and interrogation under torture. Bromley also led the panel of judges that tried Gwyn at Wrexham for high treason in October 1584 and sentenced him to death by hanging, drawing, and quartering. Despite Gwyn's repeated insistence that he viewed Elizabeth I as the lawful Queen of England, just not as the Head of the Church, Gwyn's sentence was carried out in the Beast Market of Wrexham on October 15, 1584. The canonization ceremony for St. Richard Gwyn by Pope Paul VI took place as part of that for the Forty Martyrs of England and Wales at Rome on October 25, 1970.

In 1585 Bromley felt compelled to write to the mayor and sheriffs of Chester to complain about the very poor quality of board and lodging they afforded him. He probably had fewer complaints about Shrewsbury, where he was elected recorder in June 1580, admittedly at a fee of only £4 per annum. Even before his appointment, he had advised and drafted ordinances for Shrewsbury School, assuring the headmaster, Thomas Ashton that earlier charters did not prevent him setting aside funds for university scholarships. In August 1581, when his son Francis married Joyce Leighton, daughter of Edward Leighton, the council decided make a gift to each father valued at £5, in goods of their choice, and to make a gift even to George Bromley's nephew, Henry, who was attending the event. The council must have valued Bromley highly, as in 1582 they gave him a considerable say in the financing and payment of a public preacher at St Mary's church. The Puritan Edward Bulkeley was retiring and was replaced by the even more radical iconoclast, John Tomkys. However, Bromley's responsibilities were now heavy and varied. At Bridgnorth, where he was also recorder, he had to install a deputy from 1586, when he was forced to take up leadership of the Council in the Marches.

Death

Bromley died on 2 March 1589. He was interred in St Peter's church at Worfield. His second son, Edward, had an impressive altar tomb constructed for George Bromley and Joan Waverton, bearing their effigies. The epitaph he composed reads:
Sir George Bromley, Knight, Chiefi'e Justice of Chester, and of The Covncell in the Marches of Wales : a Jvst man and a Great professor of the Religion now established, departed this life the second of March 1588, Aged 63. The said Sir George Bromley and his younger Brother, Sir Thomas Bromley, Knight, Lord Chancelor of England, were the only sonnes of George Bromley, of Hawkstone, Esqvier, and of Jane, one of the Davghters of Sir Thomas Lakon, of Willey, Knight.
The vertuous matron, Dame Jane, wife to Sir George Bromley, Knight, Daughter and sole Heire of JOHN WANNERTON, of Hallon, Gent., Departed this life 19 November 1606, Aged 73. They Had betweene them Tenne children, sixe sonnes : 4 Davghters. The worthy Judge, Sir Edward Bromley, Knight, second Baron of the Excheqver, who Kneeleth Here, of a Pious mynd did consecrate This monument to his dear Parents.
Anno 1622.

The tomb stood at the east end of the north aisle, together with Edward's own tomb. The church underwent a major restoration in 1861-2 and the Bromley tombs were moved further west in 1866 to improve the space for congregational worship.

Marriage and family

George Bromley married Joan Waverton, the daughter of John Waverton of Worfield. The name is also rendered Wannerton, as on Bromley's epitaph, and Waterton. The family are described as "rather obscure" and their origins are not certain, although the hamlet of Wannerton, near Kidderminster, is the main candidate. The Heraldic Visitation indicates that John Waverton acquired Hallon through marriage to the heiress Alicia Barker, but Randall's history of Worfield has the Wavertons acquiring Hallon from the Barkers a generation earlier. The Barker family, long the owners of Hallon, had many branches and had close links with the Hills. Joan Waverton or Wannerton long outlived George Bromley, dying on 19 November 1606 at the age of 73. Of their children,
Francis Bromley, the heir, served as MP for Shropshire. He died less than two years after his father. His son and heir, Thomas, died without issue in 1610. His daughter, Jane, married William Davenport, described as "of Hawne" in 1623, when the Davenport family were involved in an ultimately successful legal action to secure their title to Hallon.
Edward Bromley was another distinguished lawyer who became a Baron of the Exchequer. He succeeded to his nephew's estates in 1610 but Hallon became the subject of a long and bitter dispute with the Davenport family. He died without issue, leaving the family estates to his younger brother, George.
Margaret Bromley married Francis Wolryche of Dudmaston Hall. They became the ancestors of the Wolryche baronets.
Mary Bromley married George Cotton of Combermere Abbey in Cheshire. They were the ancestors of the Cotton baronets of Combermere and the later Viscounts Combermere.

Family tree: descendants

Descendants of George Bromley

See also
Richard Gwyn

Notes

References
Mary Bateson (ed) (1893). A collection of original letters from the bishops to the Privy Council, 1564 in The Camden Miscellany, Volume the Ninth, Camden Society, 1895.

Augusta Elizabeth Brickdale Corbet (c.1918).  The family of Corbet; its life and times, Volume 2, London, St. Catherine Press. Accessed 13 May 2014 at Open Library.
Coulton, Barbara, 2010. Regime and Religion: Shrewsbury 1400–1700, Logaston Press .
Ralph Flenley (1916). A calendar of the register of the Queen's Majesty's Council in the Dominion and Principality of Wales and the Marches of the same (1535) 1569–1591, Honourable Society of Cymmrodorion.  Accessed 7 May 2014 at the Open Library.
George Grazebrook and John Paul Rylands (editors) (1889). The Visitation of Shropshire, taken in the year 1623: Part I by Robert Tresswell, Somerset Herald, and Augustine Vincent, Rouge Croix Pursuivant of arms; marshals and deputies to William Camden, Clarenceux king of arms. With additions from the pedigrees of Shropshire gentry taken by the heralds in the years 1569 and 1584, and other sources, Harleian Society.  Accessed 7 May 2014 at Internet Archive.
George Grazebrook and John Paul Rylands (editors) (1889). The Visitation of Shropshire, taken in the year 1623: Part II, Harleian Society.  Accessed 10 May 2014 at Internet Archive.

Historical Manuscripts Commission, 1899. The Manuscripts of Shrewsbury and Coventry Corporations [etc] – Fourth report, Appendix: Part X, Institute of Historical Research. Accessed 13 May 2014.
Frederick Andrew Inderwick (editor) (1896). The Inner Temple: its early history, as illustrated by its records, 1505–1603, Masters of the Inner Temple and H. Sotheran.  Accessed 7 May 2014 at the Open Library.
George Ormerod (1819). The History of the County Palatine and City of Chester, Lackington, Hughes, Harding, Mavor, and Jones.  Accessed 7 May 2014 at the Open Library.
John Randall (1887). Worfield and its Townships, published by the author at Madeley, Shropshire.  Accessed 7 May 2014 at the Open Library.

John Paul Rylands (editor), 1882: The Visitation of Cheshire in the year 1580 made by Robert Glover, Somerset herald, for William Flower, Norroy king of arms, with numerous additions and continuations, including those from the visitation of Cheshire made in the year 1566, by the same herald. With an appendix, containing The visitation of a part of Cheshire in the year 1533, made by William Fellows, Lancaster Herald, for Thomas Benolte, Clarenceux king of arms. And a fragment of the visitation of the city of Chester in the year 1591, made by Thomas Chaloner, deputy to the Office of arms, Harleian Society. Accessed 7 May 2014 at Internet Archive.

1520s births
1589 deaths
Members of the Inner Temple
Lawyers from Shropshire
Members of the pre-1707 English Parliament for constituencies in Cornwall
English MPs 1558
English MPs 1559
English MPs 1563–1567
English MPs 1571
English MPs 1572–1583
16th-century English judges

16th-century English landowners
Politicians from Shropshire